Nitrianska Blatnica is a municipality with 1,192 inhabitants in the Topoľčany District of the Nitra Region, Slovakia. In the hills above the village is a church of Saint George /rotunda svätého Juraja/, from 9th and 10th century, one of the oldest remaining church buildings in Slovakia.

The Church of Saint George
The church lies on the slope of the hill Mahrát in the locality "Jurko". The site is on the important route between Váh and Nitra river basins. According to the written sources, the church was built in 1530 by Anna Thurso in memory of her husband who died in Battle of Mohács. However, an archaeological research uncovered new findings and changed the dating to the Early Medieval period, with the highest probability the Great Moravian period or shortly after. The Church of Saint George belonged to the Early Medieval court (curtis), but was a part of a separate settlement near the main court. The rotunda in Nitrianska Blatnica is similar to the Great Moravian rotunda in Ducové (7 km from Blatnica). The building was rebuilt and reconstructed several times, the current baroque look is from 1777.

References

Sources

External links
Nitrianska Blatnica
Official homepage

Villages and municipalities in Topoľčany District
Great Moravia